Luyia may refer to:
 the Luyha or Luyia people
 the Luhya or Luyia language